Thomas Llewellyn (birth unknown – death unknown) was a Welsh rugby union, and professional rugby league footballer who played in the 1900s and 1910s.

Playing career

International honours
Tom Llewellyn won caps for Wales (RL) while at Oldham in 1908 2-caps, and won caps for Great Britain (RL) while at Oldham in 1908 against New Zealand (2 matches). He also won two caps for Other Nationalities, both against England.

Championship final appearances
Tom Llewellyn played left-, i.e. number 4, in Oldham's 3–7 defeat by Wigan in the Championship Final during the 1908–09 season at The Willows, Salford on Saturday 1 May 1909.

County Cup Final appearances
Tom Llewellyn played left-, i.e. number 4, in Oldham's 9–10 defeat by Wigan in the 1908 Lancashire County Cup Final during the 1908–09 season at Wheater's Field, Broughton, Salford on Saturday 19 December 1908.

References

External links
!Great Britain Statistics at englandrl.co.uk (statistics currently missing due to not having appeared for both Great Britain, and England)
Statistics at orl-heritagetrust.org.uk

19th-century births
20th-century deaths
Great Britain national rugby league team players
Oldham R.L.F.C. players
Place of birth missing
Place of death missing
Rugby league centres
Rugby league players from Cardiff
Rugby union players from Cardiff
Treherbert RFC players
Wales national rugby league team players
Welsh rugby league players
Welsh rugby union players